Standish Michael Keon (2 July 1915 – 22 January 1987) was an Australian  politician who represented the Australian Labor Party in the Federal Parliament from 1949 to 1955, having served previously in the State Parliament of Victoria.

Early life
He was the third surviving son of Australian-born parents, Philip Tobyn Keon, a lorry driver, and his wife, Jane (née Scott). His Christian names were registered as Horace Stanley; Horace being the name of a brother who had died the previous year. He attended Roman Catholic schools in East Melbourne and Richmond, and later won a scholarship to attend Xavier College, but couldn't attend due to reduced family circumstances, which compelled him to start working at the age of 12.

Political career
Keon's November 1945 election to the electoral district of Richmond in the Victorian Parliament followed a bitter pre-selection contest between supporters of the political machine of John Wren, on one hand, and the "Catholic Social Studies Movement" of B. A. Santamaria, on the other.

Keon won the House of Representatives seat of Yarra at the 1949 federal election, succeeding former Prime Minister James Scullin. Keon himself was widely seen as a future Prime Minister. In 1955, he and six other Victorian federal members were expelled from the Labor Party as a result of the split in the party caused by the controversy surrounding the role of Industrial Groups within the ALP. In April 1955, the seven expelled Labor parliamentarians became founding members of the Australian Labor Party (Anti-Communist), which was renamed the Democratic Labor Party in 1957. Keon became the deputy leader of the new party in federal parliament under Bob Joshua.

Keon was narrowly defeated in Yarra by the Labor candidate, Jim Cairns; all of the other Labor defectors were defeated as well. He made four subsequent but unsuccessful attempts to vanquish Cairns at succeeding federal elections. He eventually had a spectacular falling-out with his controversial one-time ally Santamaria.

Notes

References

 

1915 births
1987 deaths
Australian Roman Catholics
Australian Labor Party members of the Parliament of Australia
Labor Right politicians
Democratic Labour Party members of the Parliament of Australia
Members of the Australian House of Representatives for Yarra
Members of the Australian House of Representatives
Members of the Victorian Legislative Assembly
Place of death missing
Politicians from Melbourne
20th-century Australian politicians